The following lists events that happened during 1809 in Chile.

Incumbents
Royal Governor of Chile: Francisco Antonio García Carrasco

Events
1809: The Scorpion Scandal hastened Chilean independence.

Births
1809: José Santos Lira Calvo (d. 1886)
4 September: Manuel Montt (d. 1880)

Deaths

References 

 
Chile